Zhangguying Village is an ancient village. Located in Zhangguying Town, Yueyang County, Hunan Province, the village is named after the forefather Zhang Guying. it is famous for its ancient building complex in the Ming and Qing dynasties. The village was also included on the first batch list of National Famous Historical and Cultural Villages on October 8, 2003; and became one of AAAA-rated tourist attractions on December 18, 2014.

References

Traditional folk houses in Hunan
Yueyang County
AAAA-rated tourist attractions
Major National Historical and Cultural Sites in Hunan
Villages in China